"Nazar Na Lag Jaye" is a song by Indian singer Ramji Gulati, released as a single by United White Flag on 21 September 2019.
 	
The song is sung by Ramji Gulati , and is released under the United White Music label. It is featuring Team07 (Faisal Shaikh, Hasnain Khan, Adnaan Shaikh, Faiz Baloch and Shadan Farooqui) and Ramji Gulati. The lyrics, written by MOODY and AKKHAR.

References

2019 songs